Joël Aviragnet is a French politician representing the Socialist Party. He was elected to the French National Assembly on 18 June 2017, representing the department of Haute-Garonne's 8th constituency. His election was annulled by the Constitutional Council, leading to a by-election in 2018 at which Aviragnet was elected again. He was re-elected in the 2022 election.

See also
 2017 French legislative election
 2022 French legislative election

References

Year of birth missing (living people)
Living people
Deputies of the 15th National Assembly of the French Fifth Republic
Socialist Party (France) politicians
Place of birth missing (living people)
Members of Parliament for Haute-Garonne
Deputies of the 16th National Assembly of the French Fifth Republic